Abbad is an Islamic name. Origin of this name is Arabic. Meaning of Abbad in Arabic is 'best worshipper', of those who worship Allah. People with this name include:

 Abbad ibn Bishr (c. 597–632), from the Arabian peninsula and companion to the Islamic prophet, Muhammad
 Abbad ibn Ziyad (d. 718), son of Ziyad ibn Abih and governor of Sistan for Caliph Muawiyah I
 Abbad I or Abu al-Qasim Muhammad ibn Abbad (ruled from 1023 and died in 1042), founder of the Abbadid dynasty in Seville
 Abbad II, Abbad II al-Mu'tadid or Abu Amr Abbad (ruled from 1042 and died in 1069), second ruler of the Abbadid dynasty in Seville
 Abbad III or Al-Mu'tamid ibn Abbad (1040–1095), poet and third and last ruler of the Abbadid dynasty in Seville
 Ibn Abbad al-Rundi (1333–1390), leading Sufi theologian, active in Magreb, Morocco
 Fray Íñigo Abbad y Lasierra (1745–1813), Spanish Benedictine monk and historian of Puerto Rico

See also

References 

Arabic masculine given names